Less Than Human is the debut album by electronic artist The Juan MacLean, formerly of Six Finger Satellite. It was released on DFA Records in August 2005. The title is named after a track from the Der Half-Machine 10" that is not included in this album.

Track listing
"AD 2003" – 2:03
"Shining Skinned Friend" – 4:27
"Give Me Every Little Thing" – 5:25
"Tito's Way" – 3:40
"Love Is in the Air" – 2:54
"In the Afternoon" – 1:52
"My Time Is Running Out" – 5:21
"Crush the Liberation" – 6:45
"Dance with Me" – 14:07

Production notes
 "ad 2003" (produced by the DFA with Juan MacLean)
 "Shining Skinned Friend" (produced by the DFA with Juan MacLean)
Drums by Jerry Fuchs
Vocals by Juan MacLean
Additional vocals by Nancy Whang
 "Give Me Every Little Thing" (produced by the DFA with Juan MacLean)
Vocals by James Murphy and Nancy Whang
Words by James Murphy
 "Tito's Way" (produced by the DFA with Juan MacLean)
Drums by Nick Atocha
Words and vocals by Nancy Whang
Additional vocals by Juan MacLean
 "Love Is in the Air" (produced by Juan MacLean)
 "In the Afternoon" (produced by the DFA with Juan McLean)
Vocals by Juan MacLean and Nancy Whang
 "My Time Is Running Out" (produced by the DFA with Juan McLean)
Vocals by Nancy Whang
 "Crush the Liberation" (produced by the DFA with Juan McLean)
Vocals by Nancy Whang
Contains sample from "I Got My Mind Made Up" by Instant Funk
 "Dance With Me" (produced by the DFA with Juan McLean)
Words and vocals by Nancy Whang

References

The Juan MacLean albums
2005 debut albums
Dance-punk albums